The 1863 Pennsylvania gubernatorial election occurred on October 13, 1863. Incumbent governor Andrew Gregg Curtin, a Republican, was a candidate for re-election. Curtin defeated Democratic candidate George Washington Woodward to win another term.

Results

References

1863
Pennsylvania
Gubernatorial
October 1863 events